Sudip Datta Bhaumik (died 21 November 2017) was a journalist killed in the north-eastern state of Tripura in India by a police officer of the Tripura State Rifles during an altercation. Sudip was a reporter for the Bengali language newspaper Syandan Patrika and the local television channel News Vanguard.

The Tripura chief minister, Manik Sarkar, and the union home minister of state, Kiren Rijiju, condemned the killing.

See also
Santanu Bhowmik
List of journalists killed in India

References

20th-century births
2017 deaths
Journalists from Tripura
Journalists killed in India
Murdered Indian journalists